Contact is the fourth album from the Ukrainian psychobilly band Mad Heads. It was released in Ukraine and in Germany and it was the first album consisting only of Ukrainian and Russian language songs.

Lyrics of songs "Не По пути" (Ne Po Puti) and "Не Чекай" (Ne Cheakay) by Shtoyko Kostyantin.

The tracks "Не Чекай" (Ne Cheakay), "Не По пути" (Ne Po Puti), "Отрута"(Otruta) and "Вженема" (VzeNema) appeared on  the Ukraine-released compilation album Naykrascha Myt.

Track listing
" Контакт" (Contact) - 2:31
" Не По Пути" (Ne Po Puti) - 2:35
" Отрута" (Otruta) - 3:17
" Не Чекай" (Ne Cheakay) - 3:45
" Циклон" (Cyclone) - 2:25
" Параллельный Мир" (paralellniy Mir) - 3:37
" Привиди" (Prividi) - 4:14
" Хот Род Бугі Вугі" (Hot Rod Boogie Woogie) - 3:45
" Брюс Уиллис" (Bruce Willis) - 4:13
" Вуду" (Woodoo)- 5:34
" Козаки" (Cossack)- 3:27
" У Минулому Житті" (U Minulomu Jitti) - 4:28
" Вженема" (VzeNema) - 3:24
" Свінгсайз" (Swingsize) - 4:27

Video
Отрута (Otruta) by Victor Priduvalov (Mental drive studio)
Не Чекай (Ne Cheakay) by Re:evolution studio
Не По Пути (Ne Po Puti) by Madtwins

Personnel
Vadym Krasnooky – vocal, guitar
Maxym Krasnooky – double bass
Bogdan Ocheretyany – drums

Guest appearances
Maxym Kochetov - saxophone
Anton "Burito" Buryko - trumpet
Valeriy Chesnokov - trombone
Andriy Golovko - trombone
Ivan Bondar - saxophone

2003 albums
Mad Heads albums